Torba may refer to:

Places
Torba, Bodrum, a village in Turkey
Torba Province, Vanuatu
Torba, a village in Măgherani Commune, Mureș County, Romania
Torba, a frazione of Gornate Olona, Varese, Italy

Other uses
Torba, a cement-like material used for example in the construction of the Skorba Temples, Malta
Torba, a 2015 album by the hip hop group EarthGang

See also
Tarbha, Orissa, India